Gaiters are garments worn over the shoe and bottom of the pant or trouser leg, and used primarily as personal protective equipment;  similar garments used primarily for display are spats.
Originally, gaiters were made of leather or canvas. Today, gaiters for walking are commonly made of plasticized synthetic cloth such as polyester.  Gaiters for use on horseback continue to be made of leather. They are able to cover the gap between the pants and boots and the top is just below the knee. There are usually drawcords to help adjust the tightness. Wearing gaiters, while largely preventing most snake bites, does not provide 100% protection. 

Common materials for leg gaiters on the market are canvas, nylon, Cordura, Kevlar and leather. Nylon is better at preventing snake bites than polyester, canvas and Cordura. The best material is Kevlar, a bulletproof material commonly used to make bulletproof vests, protective gear, and protective clothing. But the downside of Kevlar is that it is expensive.

Military origins and terminology
After 1700 infantry in most European armies adopted long linen gaiters, or spatterdashes, as a protective leg covering to be worn over the woollen stockings that were a common feature in both military and civilian dress. By the 1770s military gaiters were often shortened to mid-calf length for convenience in the field.

In army parlance, a gaiter covers leg and bootlacing; a legging covers only the leg.   In RAF parlance, gaiter includes legging. The American Army during World War I and World War II had leggings, which were gaiters.  Above the knee spatterdashes were cotton or canvas, as were many gaiters of varying lengths thereafter. Leather gaiters were rare in military usage, though sometimes a calf-length cotton gaiter had leather kneecaps added.  Leggings, however, were very often made of leather, but also canvas.

On foot

Gaiters are a type of protective clothing for a person's ankles and legs below the knee. Gaiters are worn when walking, hiking, running (especially orienteering and rogaining) outdoors amongst dense underbrush or in snow, with or without snowshoes. Heavy gaiters are often worn when using crampons, to protect the leg and ankle from the spikes of the opposite foot. Gaiters strap over the hiking boot and around the person's leg to provide protection from branches and thorns and to prevent mud, snow, etc. from entering the top of the boot. Gaiters may also be worn as protection against snake bites.

Gaiters fill the same function as puttees, a part of numerous military uniforms.  Gaiters known as jambieres (derived from the French word jambe for legs, hence leggings) were part of the uniform of Zouave infantry regiments.

On horseback

During the 19th century gaiters for riding typically were known as riding gaiters, distinguishing them from the other gaiters that were in general use.  Today, half chaps are a type of gaiter worn by equestrians.  Most forms fit over the calf. These are intended to protect the rider's leg from wear by the stirrup leathers and other saddle parts.  Modern styles usually have a zipper or hook and loop fasteners on the outside of the leg.

In the Anglican church

Gaiters formed a part of the everyday clerical clothing of bishops and archdeacons of the Church of England until the middle part of the twentieth century.  They were also worn by some cathedral deans.  They were made of black cotton, wool, or silk, and buttoned up the sides, reaching to just below the knee where they would join with black breeches.  Gaiters would be worn with a clerical apron, a type of short cassock reaching to just above the knee.  The purpose of this vesture was originally practical, since archdeacons and bishops were presumed to be mobile, riding horses to various parts of a diocese or archdeaconry.  In latter years, the clothing took on a more symbolic dimension.

In popular culture
 The Doctor wore gaiters during his eighth and war incarnations.
 William Cecil Clayton, the big game hunter of Tarzan wore gaiters in the Disney adaption.
 Commander Rourke wore gaiters on Atlantis: The Lost Empire.
 Captain America wore army gaiters during World War 2 on Ultimate Avengers: The Movie.
 The uniform of New England in the Hearts of Iron IV mod Kaiserreich: Legacy of the Weltkrieg is shown to include gaiters in official art for the mod.
 Concept art by Randy Humphries for an unknown, unannounced, and unreleased Half-Life game developed by EA Montreal shows Civil Protection officers wearing hybrid gaiters/puttees as part of their uniform.
 Sly from the Ty the Tasmanian Tiger series of video games appears to wear some kind of gaiter-like apparel over his boots in his design from Ty the Tasmanian Tiger 2: Bush Rescue onwards.

See also
 Chaps
 Greave
 Kyahan
 Leggings
 Leg warmer
 Puttee
 Neck gaiter
 Shin guard
 Spats (footwear)

References

External links 
 
 
Through the Years with Gaiters from Anglicans Online

19th-century fashion
20th-century fashion
Anglican vestments
Footwear accessories
Hiking equipment
History of clothing (Western fashion)
History of fashion
Military uniforms
Protective gear
Rider apparel
Trousers and shorts